Texas's 20th congressional district of the United States House of Representatives includes the western half of San Antonio and Bexar County in Texas. The district is heavily Latino/Hispanic (predominantly of Mexican descent), as is the surrounding area. Charlie Gonzalez, who represented the district from 1999 to 2013 after succeeding his father, Henry B. González, did not seek re-election in the 2012 United States House of Representatives elections. State representative Joaquin Castro, the Democratic nominee to replace Gonzalez, defeated David Rosa, the Republican nominee, in the race for Texas's 20th district on November 6, 2012. His term began on January 3, 2013.

The 20th district is heavily Democratic. It has never sent a Republican to Congress, and has not supported a Republican for president since 1956. In 1972, this was one of two congressional districts in the state of Texas to vote for George McGovern (the other being the 18th district in Houston). In 1984, this district gave Walter Mondale 59% of its vote.

Election results from presidential races

List of members representing the district

Selected recent election results

2006 election

2012 election 
Democratic challenger Joaquin Castro defeated Republican challenger David Rosa in the race for Texas's 20th district on November 6, 2012. Prior to being elected, Castro served as a state representative of the Texas House from the state's 125th District.

2014 election 
Democratic incumbent Joaquin Castro defeated Libertarian challenger Jeffrey Blunt in the race for Texas's 20th district on November 4, 2014.

2016 election 
Democratic incumbent Joaquin Castro defeated Libertarian challenger Jeffrey Blunt and Green Party challenger Paul Pipkin in the race for Texas's 20th district on November 8, 2016.

2018 election
Democratic incumbent Joaquin Castro defeated Libertarian challenger Jeffrey Blunt in the race for Texas's 20th district on November 6, 2018

2020 election

2022 election

Historical district boundaries

See also
List of United States congressional districts

References

 Congressional Biographical Directory of the United States 1774–present

20